Tyruliai is a town in the Radviliškis district municipality in north central Lithuania. According to the 2011 census, it had a population of 275.

References

Towns in Lithuania